Agapovsky District is an administrative and municipal district (raion), one of the twenty-seven in Chelyabinsk Oblast, Russia. It is located in the southwest of the oblast. Its administrative center is the rural locality (a selo) of Agapovka. Population:  37,816 (2002 Census);  The population of Agapovka accounts for 18.9% of the district's total population.

References

Notes

Sources

Districts of Chelyabinsk Oblast